is a compilation album released for the Japanese TV series YuYu Hakusho. The album was published on March 21, 1997 by Pony Canyon.

The album includes hit songs that were featured in the YuYu Hakusho series like "Hohoemi no Bakudan" (JP #45) and "Unbalance na Kiss wo Shite" (JP #28) and pop ballad "Taiyou ga Mata Kagayaku Toki" (JP #9).

Content 
The album features opening and ending theme songs to YuYu Hakusho series, namely "Sayonara Bye Bye", "Hohoemi no Bakudan", "Daydream Generation" and "Unbalanced kisses".

Numerous tracks are sung by voice actors who originally portrayed the YuYu Hakusho characters including Kurama (Megumi Ogata), Yusuke (Nozomu Sasaki), Kuwabara (Shigeru Chiba) and Hiei (Nobuyuki Hiyama).

Album

Track listing

References 

1997 soundtrack albums
Anime soundtracks
YuYu Hakusho
Pony Canyon compilation albums